Killay North is a former electoral ward in the City and County of Swansea, Wales which consisted of some or all of the following areas: Killay, Olchfa and Waunarlwydd, in the parliamentary constituency of Swansea West. The village of Killay is located mainly in this ward, set high above sea level, about 3.5 miles west of Swansea city centre.

Killay North was bounded by Gowerton and Cockett to the north; Sketty to the east; Killay South to the south and Dunvant to the west.

For the 2012 local council elections, the turnout in Killay North was 22.66%.  The results were:

Former electoral wards of Swansea